Die Tat (The Deed or The Action) was a German monthly publication of politics and culture. It was founded in April 1909 and its publisher (from 1912 on) was Eugen Diederichs from Jena. From 1939 until 1944 Die Tat was continued as Das XX. Jahrhundert.

1909–1912
The magazine was founded by the freemason Ernst Horneffer. It had the subtitle Wege zu freiem Menschentum, which in this case would be that of a Nietzsche-man.

1912–1928
In October 1912 Eugen Diederichs took control of the magazine, which at that point had only a distribution of about 1,000. The content would change, and from now on it would sport the subtitle Eine sozial-religiöse Monatsschrift, later changed to Sozial-religiöse Monatsschrift für deutsche Kultur.  Again, in 1921 Diederichs would change the title of Die Tat, implying another change of viewership and ideology: Die Tat. Monatsschrift für die Zukunft deutscher Kultur.

1928–1929
In 1928 Diederichs transferred editorial control of Die Tat to the writer Adam Kuckhoff (who was later executed by the Nazis). This would only last shortly. The magazine would be restyled however, getting the subtitle Monatsschrift zur Gestaltung neuer Wirklichkeit.

1929–1933

Hans Zehrer would become (unofficial) chief editor of Die Tate in September 1929 (now subtitled as Unabhängig Monatsschrift zur Gestaltung neuer Wirklichkeit), and would together with Ernst Wilhelm Eschmann, Ferdinand Fried and Giselher Wirsing make Die Tate into an influential promoter of the Tatkreis and the Conservative Revolutionary movement. In a short time the circulation of the magazine would rise to 30,000, attracting mostly a middle-class populace, and becoming a front-runner of the Nazi propaganda machine with the magazine's stress on autarky, nationalism, and anti-capitalistic tendencies. It also provided a front for Kurt von Schleicher, when Die Tate took control of the Berlin paper Tägliche Rundschau in 1932.

1933–1939
In 1933 the Nazis took control of the publication and Giselher Wirsing would become its main editor, changing the subtitle of the magazine to Unabhängige Monatsschrift in 1934. The last subtitle change of the magazine occurred in 1936, fittingly it was now to be named the  Deutsche Monatsschrift.

See also
 Tatkreis

References

Further reading
 Hans Brunzel: Die „Tat“ 1918–1933, Diss. phil., Bonn 1952
 Irmgard Heidler, Der Verleger Eugen Diederichs und seine Welt. (1896–1930) (= Mainzer Studien zur Buchwissenschaft, Bd. 8), Wiesbaden 1998.
 Hans Henneke: „Ulrich Unfried" und der Tat-Kreis in: Criticón 182/183, 2004, S. 43–46
 Edith Hanke & Gangolf Hübinger: Von der "Tat"-Gemeinde zum "Tat"-Kreis. Die Entwicklung einer Kulturzeitschrift, in: Gangolf Hübinger (ed.): Versammlungsort moderner Geister. Der Eugen Diederichs Verlag – Aufbruch ins Jahrhundert der Extreme, München 1996, S. 299–334
 Klaus Fritzsche: Politische Romantik und Gegenrevolution. Fluchtwege in der Krise der bürgerlichen Gesellschaft: Das Beispiel des Tat-Kreises. Frankfurt a. M. 1976
 Kurt Sontheimer: Der Tatkreis, in: Vierteljahrshefte für Zeitgeschichte 7, Heft 3, 1959, S. 229–260 PDF
 Siegfried Kracauer: Aufruhr der Mittelschichten. Eine Auseinandersetzung mit dem "Tat"-Kreis (1931), in: Derselbe: Schriften, Bd. 5.2, Frankfurt/Main 1990, S. 405–424
 Stefan Breuer: Anatomie der Konservativen Revolution Darmstadt 1993
 Alfred Weber: Ausgewählte Briefwechsel, (Alfred Weber Gesamtausgabe), ed. Eberhard Demm und Hartmut Soell. Marburg, 2003.
 Eugen Diederichs: Leben und Werk. Ausgewählte Briefe und Aufzeichnungen, ed. Lulu von Strauß und Torney. Jena: Diederichs, 1936.
 Marino Pulliero: Une modernité explosive. La revue Die Tat dans les renouveaux religieux, culturels et politiques de l’Allemagne d’avant 1914–1918. Genf 2008
Zum Lebensgefühl der Zwischenkriegsjugend:
 Klaus Mann, Der Wendepunkt. Frankfurt a.M. 1956.
 Areti Georgiadou: Das Leben zerfetzt sich mir in tausend Stücke. Frankfurt a.M. 1996.

German-language magazines
Conservative Revolutionary movement
Defunct political magazines published in Germany
Magazines established in 1909
Magazines disestablished in 1939
Mass media in Jena